Clark–Keith House is a historic home located at Caledonia in Livingston County, New York. It is a -story, symmetrical, five-bay building constructed of cut stone in the Federal style.  The structure was built about 1827 and has housed a tavern, post office, the village library, banks, and insurance agents.  Since the 1920s, it has been used as a residence.

It was listed on the National Register of Historic Places in 2007.

References

External links

Houses on the National Register of Historic Places in New York (state)
Historic American Buildings Survey in New York (state)
Federal architecture in New York (state)
Houses completed in 1827
Houses in Livingston County, New York
National Register of Historic Places in Livingston County, New York
1827 establishments in New York (state)